The 1991 Rugby World Cup was the second edition of the Rugby World Cup, and was jointly hosted by England, Scotland, Wales, Ireland and France: at the time, the five European countries who participated in the Five Nations Championship. This was the first Rugby World Cup to be staged in the northern hemisphere, with England the hosts of the final. Also for the first time, qualifying competitions were introduced as the number of entrants had increased from 16 nations four years before to a total of 33 countries. The eight quarter-finalists from 1987 qualified automatically with the remaining eight spots contested through qualifiers by 25 countries. This resulted in only one new side qualifying for the tournament, Western Samoa replacing Tonga. The same 16-team pool/knock-out format was used with just minor changes to the points system. South Africa was again not included because of sanctions imposed on the country by the IRB, due to the government's apartheid policies.

The pool stages produced a major shock when Western Samoa, who were making their debut in the tournament, defeated 1987 semi-finalist Wales 16–13 in Cardiff. Along with the other results in the group, this led to the elimination of Wales, who finished third in Pool 3. Also notable in pool play was that Canada finished second in their pool to qualify for the quarter-finals, which remains their best performance in the World Cup. Fiji, as quarter-finalists four years earlier, had expected to occupy that position, but after the upset loss to Canada and a hammering by France, they lost even their final match against the unfancied Romanian team. Earlier, the opening match had pitted the holders New Zealand against the hosts England: New Zealand overturned a narrow half-time deficit to win the match and the pool, both teams qualifying for the quarter-finals with easy victories in their other matches. Scotland beat Ireland to top their pool, again both teams qualifying.

In the quarter-finals, neither Canada nor Western Samoa proved a match for New Zealand or Scotland, respectively. Meanwhile, England knocked out 1987 finalist France in a bruising encounter. Australia pipped Ireland 19–18 in a thrilling match at Lansdowne Road, with a last-gasp try from fly-half Michael Lynagh coming after the Irish took an unexpected 18–15 lead. The semi-finals produced two tight matches: England overcame Scotland 9–6, a late drop goal deciding a tryless match in a torrential downpour at Murrayfield Stadium, and Australia defeated the defending champions New Zealand 16–6 at Lansdowne Road.

The final was played at Twickenham Stadium in London, and saw Australia triumph 12–6 against England, with a first-half try from prop Tony Daly.

Qualification

The following 16 teams, shown by region, qualified for the 1991 Rugby World Cup. Of the 16 teams, eight of those places were automatically filled by quarter-finalists from the 1987 World Cup and did not have to play any qualification matches. 25 nations competed in a qualification process designed to fill the remaining eight spots, bringing the total participation to 33 nations. In the event, there was only one change from the 1987 tournament, with Western Samoa appearing in place of Tonga.

Venues

 as found in ffr.fr consulted on 7 February 2013 apropos of the pool match between France and Fiji played on 8 October 1991

Squads

Referees

Format

As in the 1987 Rugby World Cup the 16 nations were divided into four pools of four nations, with each nation playing their other pool opponents once, every nation playing three times during the pool stages. Nations were awarded 2 points for a win, 1 for a draw and zero for a loss, the top two nations of every pool advanced to the quarter finals. The runners-up of each pool faced the winners of a different pool in the quarter finals. The winners moved on to the semi finals, with the winners then moving onto the final, and the losers of the semi finals contesting a third/fourth place play off.

Pool 1 was played in England
Pool 2 was played in both Scotland and Ireland, with matches played in both the Republic of Ireland and Northern Ireland
Pool 3 was played in Wales
Pool 4 was played in France

Points system

The points system that was used in the pool stage was which was changed from 1987 was as follows: 
3 points for a win
2 points for a draw
1 point for playing

A total of 32 matches (24 in the pool stage and eight in the knock-out stage) were played throughout the tournament over 30 days from 3 October 1991 to 2 November 1991.

Pool stage

Pool 1

Pool 2

Pool 3

Pool 4

Knockout stage

Quarter-finals

Semi-finals

Third-place play-off

Final

Statistics

The tournament's top point scorer was Ireland's Ralph Keyes, who scored 68 points. David Campese and Jean-Baptiste Lafond scored the most tries, six in total.

Broadcasters
The event was broadcast in the United Kingdom by ITV who took over the rights from the BBC. 13 million people in the United Kingdom watched the final.

References

External links

 Official Rugby World Cup Site
 Full Results and Statistics at ESPN
 World Cup Referees  on RugbyRefs.com

 
1991
1991 rugby union tournaments for national teams
1991–92 in English rugby union
1991–92 in French rugby union
1991–92 in Scottish rugby union
1991–92 in Irish rugby union
International rugby union competitions hosted by Ireland
International rugby union competitions hosted by England
International rugby union competitions hosted by Wales
International rugby union competitions hosted by France
International rugby union competitions hosted by Scotland
October 1991 sports events in Europe
November 1991 sports events in Europe